WAUK (540 AM) is a commercial progressive talk radio station licensed to the Washington County community of Jackson, Wisconsin, and serving the Milwaukee metropolitan area. It is known on-air as The Sha 101 FM in reference to the station's Waukesha based FM translator. The station's studios and offices are in downtown Waukesha making it the only station based in the city with a physical presence. 

The station is owned and operated by Michael Crute and Sage Weil's Civic Media with locally programmed progressive talk programing. WAUK shares the majority of its programming with Madison-based (and former Good Karma Brands sister station) WMDX with the majority of programing throughout the day live and locally based from studios at both stations. WAUK also carries several hours of Waukesha-centric programming a week.

History
The station signed on in 1964 with the call sign WYLO, which stood for "Way Low" (the station's position on the AM dial). WYLO ran a country music format for many years before switching to Christian programming. During the early 1980s, using the WAUK call sign, the station broadcast a comedy-only format, billing itself as "Your comedy connection - K15."  From 1995 to 2001, the WZER call sign was used, prior to briefly returning to WYLO and finally, WRRD.

Prior to the sale to Good Karma Broadcasting, Salem Communications owned the property and programmed a Christian talk and teaching format. The station's now-former WRRD call letters come from Salem's branding of the station, "The Word".

GKB took over operation of the signal on February 7, 2008, moving the format of 1510 AM from that daytimer-limited signal to the full-time 24/7 signal of WRRD. Formerly, ESPN Radio was heard on WAUK during the day, and WMCS (1290) from 6pm-6am since January 1, 2005 under the branding Milwaukee's ESPN Radio – 1510 Days/1290 Nights. On February 12, 2008, WAUK's call letters were switched to the 540 frequency, with the WRRD calls moving to 1510.

The new "540 ESPN" simulcasts continued with 1510 AM until May 5, 2008, when Good Karma converted the new WRRD to ESPN Deportes Radio, a Spanish language sports talk format. WMCS's time brokering arrangement with WAUK ended on June 30, 2008, when the station reclaimed nighttime hours for the music and community talk format the station aired the rest of the day until a March 2013 format change to standards as WZTI. On November 1, 2018, following Good Karma Brands' acquisition of WTMJ (620) and WKTI (94.5) from the E.W. Scripps Company, WKTI began simulcasting WAUK's programming as "94.5 ESPN FM".

As of April 20, 2020, the station began to serve as a temporary over-the-air simulcast of SiriusXM's COVID-19 pandemic-specific discussion and news channel which is an extension of the service's Doctor Radio channel; SiriusXM has made the channel available to any interested broadcaster without charge, and offers it free and clear on both their streaming and satellite radio platforms without a required subscription. It returned to regular ESPN Radio programming by mid-July 2020 as American professional sports began to resume. In late August 2020, the former WRRD (and its FM translator in Milwaukee) began to simulcast WAUK after its current owner (which Good Karma sold the station to in 2017) decided to wind down its operations as a progressive talk outlet and sell the station's studio and transmitter facility.

The station was previously owned by Beaver Dam-based Good Karma Brands (formerly Good Karma Broadcasting, LLC), headed by Craig Karmazin, son of legendary radio executive Mel Karmazin. Sister station WKTI 94.5 FM carries mainly local sports talk and WTMJ 620 AM/103.3 FM airs a news/talk and sports format.  WAUK was among the few independent network affiliates of ESPN Radio whose webstream is carried on the network's mobile apps, and whose website is hosted on ESPN.com.

On January 3, 2022, WAUK changed its format from sports to liberal talk as "The Sha 101 FM".

Effective June 30, 2022, Good Karma Brands sold WAUK and translator W266DR to Michael Crute's WAUK Radio, LLC for $650,000. Effective December 30, 2022, the station and the translator were flipped to Michael Crute and Sage Weil's Civic Media, Inc. for $775,668.

Previous sports programming
On June 4, 2019 Good Karma ended the simulcast and made WAUK mostly a pass-through for the national ESPN Radio schedule, with WKTI becoming a more locally-based sports talk station. This is a common scheduling practice for co-owned sports talk stations. The only diversion WAUK normally takes from the national ESPN Radio schedule is replacing The Will Cain Show for carriage of ESPN Milwaukee Podcenter, which compiles best-of content for the afternoon drive and is hosted by Doug Russell. ESPN Radio commercial breaks, where contractually possible, are replaced with local and sponsored content.

WAUK and WKTI are the flagships of the Marquette University Golden Eagles. The station also airs play-by-play coverage of Major League Baseball, the College Football Playoff and the NBA from ESPN Radio.

Until 2011, the station had also been the Milwaukee home of NASCAR radio coverage from all three NASCAR radio networks, as well as the LTN Hour radio show since its inception in 1985 and the Racing Roundup show.  On the November 27 edition of the LTN Hour, it was announced that WAUK would be dropping all racing programming by the end of 2011, with racing play-by-play acquired days later by Clear Channel's classic country station, WOKY (920), which eventually would go to a mixed format in January 2013 of sports talk from WTSO and Fox Sports and NBC Sports Radio programming. Clear Channel, currently known as iHeartMedia, gained the rights to Wisconsin Badgers sports for the Milwaukee market in 2014 for WAUK and WRIT-FM, usurping WAUK's limited role of airing football and basketball games pre-empted by WTMJ (620) due to rights conflicts.

WAUK transmits with 400 watts, largely to protect CBK in Watrous, Saskatchewan, a clear-channel station also on 540 AM. Despite its modest power, WAUK's signal covers a relatively substantial area due to its low frequency and Wisconsin's flat land.

Previous logo

References

External links
The Sha 101 FM website
Milwaukee radio: a retrospective

AUK
Radio stations established in 1964
1964 establishments in Wisconsin
Talk radio stations in the United States
Progressive talk radio